Boston–Mavic was a Belgian professional cycling team that existed in 1980 and 1981. Its main sponsor was electrical goods manufacturer Boston.

References

Cycling teams based in Belgium
Defunct cycling teams based in Belgium
1980 establishments in Belgium
1981 disestablishments in Belgium
Cycling teams established in 1980
Cycling teams disestablished in 1981